IPHC may refer to:
 Institut pluridisciplinaire Hubert Curien
 International Pacific Halibut Commission 
 Intellectual Property High Court of Japan
 Intraperitoneal hyperthermic chemoperfusion
 International Pentecostal Holiness Church
 International Pentecostal Holiness Church of Africa